Libya competed at the 2016 Summer Olympics in Rio de Janeiro, Brazil, from 5 to 21 August 2016. This was the nation's eleventh appearance at the Olympics since its debut at the 1964 Summer Olympics in Tokyo; seven of them were represented by the Libyan athletes under the name Libyan Arab Jamahiriya.

Libyan Olympic Committee sent a total of seven athletes, six men and one woman, to compete in six sports at the Games; all of them made their Olympic debut in Rio de Janeiro. Notable Libyan athletes were breaststroke swimmer Daniah Hagul, the lone female and the youngest of the team (aged 17), and marathon runner Mohamed Fuad Hrezi, who was awarded the honor of carrying the Libyan flag in the opening ceremony. Libya, however, has yet to win its first ever Olympic medal.

Archery
 
Libya has received an invitation from the Tripartite Commission to send a male archer to the Olympic tournament, signifying the nation's Olympic debut in the sport.

Athletics (track and field)

Libyan athletes have so far achieved qualifying standards in the following athletics events (up to a maximum of 3 athletes in each event):

Track & road events

Judo

Libya has qualified one judoka for the men's extra-lightweight category (60 kg) at the Games. Mohamed El-Kawisah earned a continental quota spot from the African region, as the highest-ranked Libyan judoka outside of direct qualifying position in the IJF World Ranking List of May 30, 2016.

Rowing

Libya has received an invitation from the Tripartite Commission to send a rower in the men's single sculls to the Rio regatta, signifying the nation's Olympic debut in the sport.

Qualification Legend: FA=Final A (medal); FB=Final B (non-medal); FC=Final C (non-medal); FD=Final D (non-medal); FE=Final E (non-medal); FF=Final F (non-medal); SA/B=Semifinals A/B; SC/D=Semifinals C/D; SE/F=Semifinals E/F; QF=Quarterfinals; R=Repechage

Swimming

Libya has received a Universality invitation from FINA to send two swimmers (one male and one female) to the Olympics.

Taekwondo
 
Libya entered one athlete into the taekwondo competition at the Olympics for the first time since 2004. Yousef Shriha secured a spot in the men's flyweight category (58 kg) by virtue of his top two finish at the 2016 African Qualification Tournament in Agadir, Morocco.

References

External links
 
 

Nations at the 2016 Summer Olympics
2016
Olympics